Richard Underwood was a  17th-century Anglican priest in Ireland.

Underwood was Precentor of Ferns and Dean of Lismore from 1661 until his death in 1664.

References

17th-century Irish Anglican priests
Deans of Lismore
1664 deaths